Jermain Nischalke (born 26 March 2003) is a German professional footballer currently playing as a forward for 1. FC Nürnberg.

Club career
Born in Germany, Nischalke progressed through the academies of professional sides Berliner SC, Hertha Zehlendorf, Union Berlin and Dynamo Dresden before joining Chemnitzer in 2020. He made his debut for Chemnitzer the following year, scoring his first goal for the club in a 3–1 Regionalliga Nordost win over Lichtenberg.

In 2022, he moved to 1. FC Nürnberg, having passed through 1. FC Magdeburg without playing for the senior squad. He was promoted to the Nürnberg first team following his exploits for the reserve team, for whom he scored 9 goals and notched 5 assists in 18 appearances. He signed his first professional contract with the club in December 2022.

International career
Despite being born in Germany, Nischalke is eligible to represent Angola at international level. He was called up to the Angolan senior squad in November 2022, and despite reportedly initially responding positively, he later rejected the call up, giving no reason.

Career statistics

Club

References

2003 births
Living people
Footballers from Berlin
German people of Angolan descent
German footballers
Angolan footballers
Association football forwards
Regionalliga players
2. Bundesliga players
Berliner SC players
Hertha Zehlendorf players
1. FC Union Berlin players
Dynamo Dresden players
Chemnitzer FC players
1. FC Magdeburg players
1. FC Nürnberg II players
1. FC Nürnberg players